The Kangayam or Kangeyam is an Indian breed of draught cattle from the state of Tamil Nadu, in South India. Its area of origin is Kongu Nadu, the region surrounding Coimbatore, close to the border between Tamil Nadu and Kerala, but it is distributed over a considerably wider area. The breed name derives from that of the town of Kangeyam. It may also be called Kanganad or Kongu.

History 

The Kangayam is a traditional draught breed of Tamil Nadu. It is not closely related to the other draught breed of the state, the Umblachery, but may have some influence from the Ongole. Its area of origin is the region surrounding Coimbatore, close to the border between Tamil Nadu and Kerala, but it is distributed over a considerably wider area; the name of the breed derives from that of the taluk of Kangeyam in Tiruppur District.

It has been exported to Brazil, where it is called the  Cangaian.

Characteristics 

The calves are red when born, but change to grey by the age of two; cows are grey or dark grey, bulls are darker and may be black on the head and foreparts. The colour of cows and oxen fades as they age, and cows may become completely white.

Use 

The Kangayam was one of the two principal draught breeds used in Tamil Nadu, the other being the Hallikar.

Bulls are used in traditional bull races, as are Hallikar and Ongole bulls. They are also commonly used in the traditional sport of Jallikattu.

References 

Cattle breeds
Animal husbandry in Tamil Nadu
Cattle breeds originating in India